The 2022 Erste Bank Open was a men's tennis tournament to be played on indoor hard courts. It was the 48th edition of the event, and part of the ATP Tour 500 Series of the 2022 ATP Tour. It was held at the Wiener Stadthalle in Vienna, Austria, from 24 until 30 October 2022.

Champions

Singles 

  Daniil Medvedev def.  Denis Shapovalov, 4–6, 6–3, 6–2

Doubles 

  Alexander Erler /  Lucas Miedler def.  Santiago González /  Andrés Molteni, 6–3, 7–6(7–1)

Singles main-draw entrants

Seeds

 Rankings are as of 17 October 2022

Other entrants
The following players received wildcards into the singles main draw: 
  Filip Misolic 
  Dennis Novak
  Jurij Rodionov 

The following player received entry as a special exempt:
  Emil Ruusuvuori

The following players received entry from the qualifying draw: 
  Quentin Halys
  Thiago Monteiro 
  Yoshihito Nishioka 
  J. J. Wolf 

The following players received entry as lucky losers:
  Pedro Cachín
  Oscar Otte

Withdrawals
  Matteo Berrettini → replaced by  Oscar Otte
  John Isner → replaced by  Marcos Giron
  Gaël Monfils → replaced by  Pedro Cachín

Doubles main-draw entrants

Seeds

 Rankings are as of 17 October 2022

Other entrants
The following pairs received wildcards into the doubles main draw:
  Alexander Erler /  Lucas Miedler 
  Robin Haase /  Philipp Oswald 

The following pair received entry from the qualifying draw:
  Sander Gillé /  Joran Vliegen

References

External links
 

Erste Bank Open
Vienna Open
Erste Bank Open
Erste Bank Open